The Pink Pistols are an LGBTQ gun rights organization in the United States and Canada. Their motto is "Pick on someone your own caliber".

History
Inspired by a Salon.com article written by Jonathan Rauch, Krikket (aka Doug Krick), a libertarian activist from Illinois while living in Massachusetts, founded the Pink Pistols in July 2000. The organization had at least 45 chapters, as of October 2014. Those chapters are located in 33 states and three countries that are principally made up of gun-owning LGBT individuals, though neither status is mandatory for membership.

The political orientation of the Pink Pistols is considered unusual due to the popular perception in the United States of firearms ownership as a "conservative issue" and sexuality as a "liberal issue". However, there is nothing within either of these two single issues that is mutually exclusive and a variety of other pro-gun organizations exist for groups not typically associated with gun rights (for example, the "Democrats for the Second Amendment").

Pink Pistols' activities include firing range visits and political activism. The group occasionally produces report cards on politicians, rating their position on issues of interest to members. According to pinkpistols.org:

The Pink Pistols' symbol consists of an overhead view of a picto-person aiming a handgun in an isosceles stance superimposed on a pink triangle. The pink triangle, now a gay pride and gay rights symbol, was originally a badge that homosexual concentration camp victims were forced to wear during the Holocaust.

According to spokesperson Gwen Patton, "We don't want people to hurt us, we want people to run away from us, and the best way we have found to do that is to be armed."  Patton has also stated that, "the Pink Pistols tend to get a better response from firearms supporters than from homosexuals".

The group's membership increased from 1,500 to 4,500 in the week after the 2016 Orlando nightclub shooting.  As of June 24, 2016, the membership is over 7,000, and there are 36 chapters around the country. The group experienced a further rise in interest following Donald Trump's election to the presidency later that year. By April 2017, the group claimed a membership of over 9,000.

On September 23, 2018, trans woman Erin Palette became the new president of the Pink Pistols.

On October 19, 2018, Pink Pistols founder Doug "Krikket" Krick killed himself with a gun.

In January 2020, winner of Season 4 of the History Channel show Top Shot, Chris Cheng (the first openly gay man to win the contest), joined the Board of Directors of Operation Blazing Sword/Pink Pistols (two gun rights-LGBT organizations that merged in 2018).

See also
 Stonewall Shooting Sports of Utah
 List of LGBT-related organizations

References

External links
 
 Murdock, Deroy.  "Coming Out of the Closet: These guys won’t be victims", National Review (July 1, 2002), via Archive.org

Gun rights advocacy groups in the United States
LGBT political advocacy groups in the United States
Organizations established in 2000
Self-defense
Libertarian organizations based in the United States
2000 establishments in the United States